Enriqueta Antolín Gimeno (1941 – 26 November 2013) was a Spanish journalist and writer, best known for her novels.

Biography
The descendant of a family deeply rooted in Palencia, Enriqueta Antolín moved to Toledo at age 6, where she lived a good part of her life. There she studied teaching, although later her vocation for journalism and literature prevailed.

Beginning in 1986 she contributed to the newspaper El País, and despite writing from her childhood, it was not until 1992 when she published her first novel, La gata con alas, which received the Tigre Juan Award for the year's best novel in Spanish. La gata con alas is a story of love and heartbreak set in postwar Spain that started a trilogy completed with Regiones devastadas (1995) and Mujer de aire (1997).

With these first three works, she earned recognition as one of the writers with the best insight into female psychology.

Her next work was Ayala sin olvidos (1998), a book of conversations with writer and academic Francisco Ayala, a mix of biography, interview, and novel. Then came two new novels: Caminar de noche (2001) and Cuentos con Rita (2003).

In 2005 she wrote the novel Final feliz, which she described thusly:

Antolín wrote three young adult novels: Kris y el verano del piano (1997), Kris y su panda ¡en la selva! (1998), and Kris y los misterios de la vida (1999), based on the adventures of Kris, a character she created.

She collaborated with the artist Marisa Gonzalez, writing the text of her book Seréis como Dioses.

Considered a pertinacious nonconformist, Antolín's work often contains a mixture of reality and fiction with which the author pretends, as she put it, "to disconcert the reader." After spending an important part of her life in Toledo, she moved her residence to Madrid. She was married to the writer and journalist Andrés Berlanga.

A street is named for her in Palencia.

Works

Novels
 La gata con alas, Alfaguara, 1992, 
 Regiones devastadas, Alfaguara, 1995, 
 Mujer de aire, Alfaguara, 1997, 
 Caminar de noche, Alfaguara, 2001, 
 Cuentos con Rita, Alfaguara, 2003, 
 Final feliz, Alfaguara, 2005, 
 Qué escribes, Pamela, Menoscuarto, 2012, finalist for the 2013

Young adult fiction
 Kris y el verano del piano, Alfaguay, 1997, 
 Kris y su panda ¡en la selva!, Alfaguay, 1998, 
 Kris y los misterios de la vida, Alfaguay, 1999,

Essays
 "El territorio de las letras" in El territorio de las letras, Cátedra-Ministerio de Cultura, pp. 9–12, 1994, 
 Ayala sin olvidos, Alfaguara, 1998,

Historical essays
 Musulmanas y judías en la España medieval: Vidas paralelas, M. Fundes, Cuenta y Razón, 1997

References

1941 births
2013 deaths
20th-century Spanish novelists
20th-century Spanish women writers
21st-century Spanish novelists
21st-century Spanish women writers
People from Palencia
20th-century Spanish journalists
Spanish women essayists
Spanish women journalists
Spanish writers of young adult literature
21st-century Spanish journalists